Patrik Redo (born 24 November 1981 in Anderstorp) is a Swedish football player, who currently plays for Kristianstads FF.

Career
Starting his career in Anderstorp IF he later moved to Halmstad and IF Leikin. In 2002, he moved to local rivals Halmstads BK. However, after making only a few appearances he was loaned to Trelleborgs FF in 2003 and was later purchased by Trelleborg. In 2007, he moved to Iceland and Fram in the Icelandic Úrvalsdeild. He stayed only one season before moving to league rivals Keflavik, yet again staying only a year before in 2009 returning to Sweden and Jönköpings Södra IF. The midfielder left on 17 March 2011 his club Jönköpings Södra IF and signed with Kristianstads FF.

References 

1986 births
Living people
People from Gislaved Municipality
Swedish footballers
Halmstads BK players
Trelleborgs FF players
Knattspyrnufélagið Fram players
Knattspyrnudeild Keflavík players
Swedish expatriates in Iceland
Allsvenskan players
Expatriate footballers in Iceland
Jönköpings Södra IF players
Association football midfielders
Association football forwards
Sportspeople from Jönköping County